The 2012–13 Czech 1.liga season was the 20th season of the Czech 1.liga, the second level of ice hockey in the Czech Republic. 14 teams participated in the league, and BK Mladá Boleslav and HC Olomouc qualified for the qualification round of the Czech Extraliga.

Regular season

Playoffs

BK Mladá Boleslav and HC Olomouc proceeded directly to the qualification round of the Czech Extraliga after winning their semifinal series. Both teams failed to qualify, however.

Relegation round

External links 
 Hokej.cz

3
Czech 1. Liga seasons
Czech